Lukhanji Local Municipality was an administrative area in the Chris Hani District of the Eastern Cape in South Africa. Lukhanji is a Xhosa name for the mountain that runs from the eastern side of Queenstown to the western side. After municipal elections on 3 August 2016 it was merged into the larger Enoch Mgijima Local Municipality.

Main places
The 2011 census divided the municipality into the following main places (Note: only places with more than 1,000 inhabitants listed here):

Politics
The municipal council consisted of fifty-four members elected by mixed-member proportional representation. Twenty-seven councillors were elected by first-past-the-post voting in twenty-seven wards, while the remaining twenty-seven were chosen from party lists so that the total number of party representatives was proportional to the number of votes received. In the election of 18 May 2011 the African National Congress (ANC) won a majority of forty-five seats on the council.
The following table shows the results of the election.

References

External links
 Official website

Former local municipalities of South Africa
Lukhanji Local Municipality